Line SFM7 is a commuter rail line that is part of the Turin Metropolitan Railway Service, and links Turin to Fossano.

Rolling stock used are MDVC carriages, MDVE carriages, and Vivalto bi-level coaches.

References

Turin Metropolitan Railway Service